O Xangô de Baker Street (English title: A Samba for Sherlock) is 2001 Brazilian-Portuguese film directed by Miguel Faria, Jr., based on the novel of the same name by Jô Soares. The film was first announced in 1996, but filming only started in September 1998 in Porto, Portugal, lasting until 1999.

Plot
Rio de Janeiro, 1886. Actress Sarah Bernhardt performs at the city's Municipal Theater, captivating the local audience enthralled by French culture. The city is at her feet, and even the Emperor Pedro II comes to pay his respects. He confides a secret to her: the disappearance of a precious Stradivarius violin presented by him to the charming widow Baroness Maria Luiza. The actress suggests to the monarch to hire her friend, the legendary British detective Sherlock Holmes, to solve the case. Subsequently, a brutal murder shocks the city, and leaves the police superintendent Mello Pimenta: a prostitute had been killed and mutilated, her ears cut off and a violin string strategically placed on her body by the perpetrator. Later, under the heat of the tropical sun, the lives of Holmes and Doctor Watson are changed forever, as they find themselves neck-deep in a cultural milieu that portrays all standard Brazilian stereotypes.

Cast
Joaquim de Almeida	... 	Sherlock Holmes
Marco Nanini	... 	Mello Pimenta
Anthony O'Donnell	... 	Doctor Watson
Maria de Medeiros	... 	Sarah Bernhardt
Cláudia Abreu	... 	Baroness Maria Luiza
Caco Ciocler	... 	Miguel Solera de Lara
Marcello Antony	... 	Marquês de Salles
Cláudio Marzo	... 	Emperor Pedro II
Martha Overbeck	... 	Empress Theresa Christina
Thalma de Freitas	... 	Ana Candelária
Letícia Sabatella	... 	Esperidiana
Malu Galli 	... 	Chiquinha Gonzaga
Jô Soares  	... 	Desembargador Coelho Bastos
Walney Costa	... 	José White
Roger Belo 	... 	Comte d'Eu
Regiana Antonini	... 	Princess Isabel
Christine Fernandes ... Albertina

References

External links
 

Fiction set in 1886
2001 films
2000s Portuguese-language films
Brazilian comedy films
Portuguese comedy films
Films shot in Rio de Janeiro (city)
Films shot in Portugal
Films based on Brazilian novels
2000s serial killer films
Cultural depictions of Sarah Bernhardt
Cultural depictions of Jack the Ripper
2001 comedy films